Caustic Zombies is an independent horror film written and directed by Johnny Daggers. It was filmed in Latrobe and Ligonier, Pennsylvania. The film premiered on July 22, 2011 at the Hollywood Theater in Dormont, Pennsylvania.

Plot
Residents of a small town must survive a zombie attack stemming from the Three Mile Island accident.

Cast and crew
The cast and crew listed at the film's official website are:
 Aleesha Asper - survivor
 Greg Wainwright - survivor
 Jake Hursh - survivor
 Melanie Stone - caged zombie
 Chad Hammitt - zombie hunter
 Matt Eames -  hacker
 Writer/Director - Johnny Daggers
 Cinematographer - James Bowley
 Editor - James Bowley, Johnny Daggers, John Stefanik
 Title Credits Design - Brian Cottington
 Key grip - Barry Stephens

References

External links
 
 

2011 films
American zombie films
American independent films
2011 horror films
2010s English-language films
2010s American films